Ronnie Schneider (born September 27, 1994) is an American tennis player.

Schneider has a career high ATP singles ranking of 406 achieved on 9 September 2018. He also has a career high ATP doubles ranking of 313 achieved on 12 October 2018.

Schneider made his Grand Slam main draw debut at the 2013 US Open in the doubles draw partnering Paul Oosterbaan.

Schneider played college tennis at the University of North Carolina at Chapel Hill.

References

External links

1994 births
Living people
American male tennis players
Sportspeople from Bloomington, Indiana
North Carolina Tar Heels men's tennis players
Tennis people from Indiana